Goodenia xanthosperma, commonly known as yellow-seeded goodenia, is a species of flowering plant in the family Goodeniaceae and is endemic to southern inland Western Australia. It is a prostrate herb with elliptic to egg-shaped leaves at the base of the plant and racemes of yellow flowers with purplish markings.

Description
Flowering mainly occurs from May to October.

Taxonomy and naming
Goodenia xanthosperma was first formally described in 1876 by Ferdinand von Mueller in Fragmenta phytographiae Australiae from specimens collected by Jess Young. The specific epithet (xanthosperma) means "yellow-seeded".

Distribution
This goodenia grows in sandy soil on sandplains in the drier areas of southern inland Western Australia.

Conservation status
Goodenia xanthosperma is classified as "not threatened" by the Government of Western Australia Department of Parks and Wildlife.

References

xanthosperma
Eudicots of Western Australia
Taxa named by Ferdinand von Mueller
Plants described in 1876